Deborah Berger (1956 –  May 21, 2005) was an American artist noted for her oeuvre of brightly colored textile works created in knitting and crochet. She is considered an outsider artist and a prodigy.

Life
Deborah Berger was born in 1956 in Englishtown, New Jersey. Berger was born with autism and attended boarding schools for special needs children in Texas and Pennsylvania.

Work
Deborah Berger started knitting as a young child. By the age of ten she was creating garments for herself. Wearable works are the focus of much of her creative production. Bands of brilliant color: red, lavender, orange, blue and black, build, stripe after stripe, into coats and skirts, and form complex, sculptural masks and headdresses.

Recognition
Berger's work, over 100 pieces including wearable garments, baskets, blankets, games and masks, was discovered by her family after her death in New Orleans in 2005. The New Orleans Museum of Art inventoried the works, and archival documents pertaining to Berger's work and life, and a selection was sent to the American Visionary Art Museum in Baltimore.

Collections and exhibits
Deborah Berger's work is primarily held in the American Visionary Art Museum in Baltimore, Maryland. Her pieces have been lent to other institutions for exhibitions, including the 2015 exhibit When the Curtain Never Comes Down at the American Folk Art Museum.

References

External links
 2015 Behind the Mask: Performance, Ritual, and the Artist
 2011 DEBORAH BERGER! CROCHET!!!

1956 births
2005 deaths
20th-century American artists
21st-century American artists
Textile artists
Women textile artists
Outsider artists
Women outsider artists
Artists with autism
20th-century American women artists
21st-century American women artists
People from Englishtown, New Jersey
People in knitting